= Gong Shang Ri Bao (Tangshan) =

Chinese newspaper

Gong Shang Ri Bao (Chinese: 工商日報; pinyin: Gōng Shāng Rì Bào) was a Chinese newspaper in Tangshan, Hebei Province from 1932 to 1938.

== Notable people ==
- Hong Linge (simplified Chinese: 洪麟阁; traditional Chinese: 洪麟閣; pinyin: Hóng Lín Gé), former editor-in-chief, civilian militia during the Second Sino-Japanese War.
